The 2018 Città di Caltanissetta was a professional tennis tournament played on clay courts. It was the 20th edition of the tournament which was a part of the 2018 ATP Challenger Tour. It took place in Caltanissetta, Italy between 11 and 17 June 2018.

Singles main-draw entrants

Seeds

 1 Rankings are as of 28 May 2018.

Other entrants
The following players received wildcards into the singles main draw:
  Filippo Baldi
  Alejandro Davidovich Fokina
  Omar Giacalone
  Gian Marco Moroni

The following players received entry from the qualifying draw:
  Marco Bortolotti
  Federico Gaio
  Marc Sieber
  Miljan Zekić

The following players received entry as lucky losers:
  Martín Cuevas
  Maxime Janvier

Champions

Singles

 Jaume Munar def.  Matteo Donati 6–2, 7–6(7–2).

Doubles

 Federico Gaio /  Andrea Pellegrino def.  Blaž Rola /  Jiří Veselý 7–6(7–4), 7–6(7–5).

External links
Official Website

Città di Caltanissetta
2018